Rinchnach Priory was a Benedictine monastery at Rinchnach in Bavaria, Germany.

History
The monastery, dedicated to Saint John the Baptist, was founded in 1011 by Saint Gunther, a Benedictine monk of Niederaltaich Abbey, as the first settlement in the central Bavarian Forest. In 1029 Emperor Conrad II endowed the monastery with land. It was made a priory of Niederaltaich in 1040, when Saint Gunther moved on to Gutwasser (the present Dobra Voda) in Bohemia.

In 1488 (?) the Hussites burnt the monastery down. In 1703 it was pillaged by Hungarian regiments, but restored in 1708 by Niederaltaich Abbey.

The monastery was dissolved in 1803 as a result of the secularisation of Bavaria, and its estates were auctioned off.

References

Further reading
Dengler, Josef: Rinchnach. Kirche St. Johannes der Täufer. Ehem. Propsteikirche (publ. Kath. Pfarramt Rinchnach, Peda-Kunstführer Nr. 803/2010), Passau 2010 (with bibliography)
Ecclesia Rimichinaha/Propstei – Rinchnach/Klousta – Vom zentralen Klosterort des Mittleren Bay. Waldes (1011/12–1803) zur selbstbewussten Gemeinde. Katalog zur Ausstellung 2011 (exhibition catalogue publ. by the Rinchnacher Arbeitskreis Geschichte und Kultur), Rinchnach 2011
Hemmerle, Josef: Die Benediktinerklöster in Bayern (Germania Benedictina Bd. 2), München 1970, pp. 261–263

External links

Monasteries in Bavaria
Benedictine monasteries in Germany
1011 establishments in Europe
Christian monasteries established in the 11th century
Regen (district)